The 2020–21 Tampa Bay Lightning season was the 29th season for the National Hockey League (NHL) franchise that was established on December 16, 1991. The Lightning entered the season as the defending Stanley Cup champions. In a joint announcement from the NHL and NHLPA on October 6, 2020, a target date of January 1, 2021 was set for the start of the season. It was reported December 18, 2020 that the two parties had tentatively agreed to a 56-game season scheduled to begin on January 13, 2021.

Because the COVID-19 pandemic was still ongoing prior to the season, as part of the league's return to play protocols, the divisions were realigned and the Lightning were put into the Central Division. This new configuration retained Chicago, Dallas, and Nashville, while it added Detroit and Florida from the Atlantic Division, as well as Carolina and Columbus from the Metropolitan Division. The regular season schedule was announced on December 23, 2020. Opponents in each game during the regular season and potentially the first two rounds of the playoffs are from within the new division.

The Lightning entered the 2021 Stanley Cup Playoffs as the defending Stanley Cup champions and the third seed in the Central Division. In the first round, the Lightning defeated their in-state rival the Florida Panthers in six games. They went on to defeat the Carolina Hurricanes in five games to earn a spot in the Semifinals, where they defeated the New York Islanders in seven games to reach the Stanley Cup Finals for the second consecutive season. Tampa Bay would then repeat as champions in five games against the Montreal Canadiens.

Off-season

September
The Lightning's off-season began after the team captured its second Stanley Cup in franchise history in a 4–2 series win over the Dallas Stars.

October
On October 7, 2020, the Lightning re-signed forwards Mitchell Stephens and Gemel Smith to contract extensions. Stepehens was signed to a two-year extension after being part of the 2020 Stanley Cup championship roster. Smith signed a one-year deal after appearing in 3 regular season games for the Lightning and spending the majority of the season with the Syracuse Crunch.

At the 2020 NHL Entry Draft the Lightning selected Jack Finley, Gage Goncalves, Maxim Groshev, Jack Thompson, Eamon Powell, Jaydon Dureau, Nick Capone, Amir Miftakhov and Declan McDonnell.

Later in the evening the Lightning announced that it had issued qualifying offers to Anthony Cirelli, Erik Cernak, Ross Colton, Mathieu Joseph, Dominik Masin, Mikhail Sergachev, Ben Thomas and Alex Volkov. The team did not issue qualifying offers to Devante Stephens, Carter Verhaeghe and Dennis Yan.

On October 9, 2020, the Lightning placed Tyler Johnson on waivers after being unable to trade him prior to free agency. Johnson has a $5 million cap hit with 4-years remaining on his current contract with the Lightning. Johnson cleared waivers the following day after going unclaimed by another team.

That same day the Lightning announced that it had signed forward Patrick Maroon to a two-year contract extension. Maroon skated in all of the Lightning's playoff games on their way to winning their second Stanley Cup in Franchise history.

Around the same time Lightning re-signed defenseman Luke Schenn to a one-year contract extension. Scheen appeared in 25 regular season games and 11 playoff games during the Lightning's championship run. Schenn's contract will count only $800k against the salary cap.

The Lightning also made a series of depth signings that day. The Lightning signed defenseman Andreas Borgman and goaltender and Christopher Gibson. The Lightning also re-signed Spencer Martin to a one-year contract extension. Martin had spent the previous season with the Lightning's AHL affiliate the Syracuse Crunch. Borgman played in 53 games this past season for the San Antonio Rampage.  Gibson appeared in net in 25 games for the Bridgeport Sound Tigers this past season.

On October 12, 2020, the Lightning announced the re-signing of defensemen prospect Ben Thomas. Thomas has been with the Syracuse Crunch for the past 4-seasons where he has appeared in over 200 career games. Thomas was originally drafted by Lightning in the 4th-round of the 2014 NHL Entry Draft.

On October 14, 2020, the Lightning announced that it had re-signed forward prospect Ross Colton. Colton had spent the last 2-years playing in the AHL for the Syracuse Crunch. Colton was drafted by the Lightning in the 4th-round of the 2016 NHL Entry Draft.

On October 23, 2020, it was announced that assistant coach Todd Richards was leaving the Lightning to take an assistant coaching job with the Nashville Predators. Richards spent the past four seasons with the Lightning and helped the team capture its second Stanley Cup.

November

On November 25, 2020, the Lightning announced the re-signing of defenseman Mikhail Sergachev to a three-year contract extension. The contract carries a $4.8 million cap hit. Since coming over to the Lightning via trade, Sergachev has produced three straight seasons of 30+ points and helped the franchise to its second Stanley Cup.

December

On December 7, 2020, the Lightning announced the hiring of assistant coach Rob Zettler. Zettler was previously an assistant of Lightning head coach Jon Cooper when he was the head coach of the Syracuse Crunch in the American Hockey League. Zettler took over as head coach of the Crunch after Cooper was promoted to be the Lightning's bench boss. Zettler was released by the team after three seasons. Zettler went on to spend 2 seasons as an assistant coach with the San Jose Sharks and a season of prospect coaching for Adam Oates and the Oates Sports Group. Zettler will fill in the vacancy left by the departure of Todd Richards. Richards worked with the Lightning defensemen and handled the team's penalty kill.

On December 12, 2020, the Lightning announced the signing of 2020 NHL draft pick, Jack Finley. Finley has spent the past three seasons with the Spokane Chiefs where he has skated in 131 career games. In those games he recorded 28 goals and 77 points.

On December 13, 2020, the Lightning announced the signing of another 2020 NHL draft pick. The Lightning signed center Gage Goncalves to a three-year entry level contract. Goncalves was originally an undrafted camp invite by the Everett Silvertips of the Western Hockey League before being drafted by the Lightning. Gonclaves has appeared in 128 career games, recording 34 goals, 52 assists and 86 points.

On December 22, 2020, the Lightning announced the re-signing of defenseman Erik Cernak to a three-year contract extension. Cernak played in 67 games last season and lead the team in hits (172). In the Lightning's championship run, Cernak appeared in all 25 games, which he averaged over 20 minutes of ice time per game. That was the fourth highest among the Lightning's defensemen.    

On December 23, 2020, the Lightning announced the re-signing of forwards Mathieu Joseph and Alexander Volkov. Joseph was signed to a two-year extension and Volkov was signed to a one-year extension. Both forwards split the season between the Lightning and their AHL affiliate. Joseph played in 37 regular season games with the Lightning, scoring 4 goals and 3 assists. Volkov appeared in 9 regular season games, recording 1 assist. Volkov also drew into the Lightning's cup clinching game win over the Dallas Stars.

The Lightning also announced the re-signing of defenseman Jan Rutta to a two-year extension. Rutta played in 33 regular season games, recording a goal and six assists. Rutta also plated in 6 playoffs, recording a lone assist during the Lightning's cup run. Rutta was originally acquired by the Lightning via trade from the Chicago Blackhawks in 2019.

On December 24, 2020, the Lightning announced the re-signing of forward Anthony Cirelli to a 3-year contract extension. Cirelli had 16 goals and 28 assists over 68 games in the regular season. Cirelli picked up 6 assists in the Lightning's 25-playoff games. Along with winning the Stanley Cup, Cirelli finished the past season 4th in Selke Trophy voting. The Selke is awarded to the best defensive forward in the NHL.

On December 27, 2020, the Lightning announced that it had traded Braydon Coburn, Cedric Paquette and their 2021 2nd-round pick to the Ottawa Senators in exchange for Anders Nilsson and Marian Gaborik. Both Nilsson and Gaborik will be placed on long term injured reserve for additional salary cap space to allow the Lightning to become cap compliant for the upcoming season.

Training camp

January

On January 1, 2021, the Lightning announced its training camp roster for the 2020-2021 season. The roster consists of 25 forwards, 14 defensemen and 4 goaltenders. The notable absence from this group is forward Nikita Kucherov. Kucherov will miss at least all of the regular season after having hip surgery. The team remains optimistic that he will be able to return to action in the playoffs.

The forward group consists of Alex Barre-Boulet, Anthony Cirelli, Ross Colton, Blake Coleman, Jack Finley, Gage Goncalves, Barclay Goodrow, Yanni Gourde, Jimmy Huntington, Tyler Johnson, Mathieu Joseph, Boris Katchouk, Alex Killorn, Ryan Lohin, Patrick Maroon, Christoval Nieves, Ondrej Palat, Brayden Point, Taylor Raddysh, Gemel Smith, Steven Stamkos, Mitchell Stephens, Alexander Volkov and Daniel Walcott.

The defensemen group consists of Andreas Borgman, Erik Cernak, Sean Day, Cal Foote, Alex Green, Victor Hedman, Ryan McDonagh Jan Rutta, Luke Schenn, Dmitry Semykin, Mikhail Sergachev, Devante Stephens, Ben Thomas and Luke Witkowski.

The goaltending group consists of Christopher Gibson, Spencer Martin, Curtis McElhinney and Andrei Vasilevskiy.

On January 8, 2021, the Lightning announced its first roster cuts for the upcoming season. The team assigned Ryan Lohin and Devante Stephens to Orlando Solar Bears of the ECHL. There were 41-players remaining after the first round of roster cuts.

On January 11, 2021, the Lightning announced the final round of roster moves for the start of the season. The Lightning assigned Alex Barre-Boulet, Ross Colton, Sean Day, Jack Finley, Gage Goncalves, Alex Green, Jimmy Huntington, Boris Katchouk, Taylor Raddysh and Dmitry Semykin to the Syracuse Crunch. The Lightning placed Spencer Martin, Daniel Walcott and Luke Witkowski on waivers for purposes of assignment to Syracuse.

The Lightning also announced that it had placed Andreas Borgman, Christopher Gibson, Tyler Johnson, Luke Schenn, Gemel Smith and Ben Thomas. If the players clear waivers they are likely destined for the team's taxi squad. The taxi squad was created for the coming season in respose to the COVID-19 pandemic.

The following day all the players that were placed on waivers pervious day had cleared without being claimed by another team. Those not destined for Syracuse were set to be assigned to the taxi squad on opening night the following day.

Latter that day the Lightning also announced that it had signed forward Boo Nieves to a one-year contract after joining the team on a PTO contract for training camp. Nieves had previously played in the New York Rangers system for the past 4-seasons. It remains to be seen if the team will use Nieves on its taxi squad or if he will be assigned to Syracuse at a later date.

With the completion of these moves the team set up its opening night roster. The forward group consists of Anthony Cirelli, Blake Coleman, Barclay Goodrow, Yanni Gourde, Mathieu Joseph, Alex Killorn, Patrick Maroon, Ondrej Palat, Brayden Point, Steven Stamkos, Mitchell Stephens and Alexander Volkov. The defensemen group consists of Erik Cernak, Cal Foote, Victor Hedman, Ryan McDonagh, Jan Rutta and Mikhail Sergachev. Andrei Vasilevskiy and Curtis McElhinney round out the roster in net.

The taxi squad roster consists of Tyler Johnson (C), Gemel Smith (C), Luke Schenn (RD), Andreas Borgman (LD), Ben Thomas (RD) and Christopher Gibson (G). Lightning General Manager Julien BriseBois stated that Johnson would be added to the active roster after the first game due to cap reasons. It remains to be seen what the team will do with Boo Nieves. Due to the timing of the signing Nieves is unable to be assigned to taxi squad until after the first game.

Standings

Schedule and results

Regular season

|- align="center" bgcolor="ccffcc"
| 1 || January 13 || Chicago Blackhawks || 5–1 ||  || Vasilevskiy || Amalie Arena || Held without fans || 1–0–0 || 2 || 
|- align="center" bgcolor="ccffcc"
| 2 || January 15 || Chicago Blackhawks || 5–2 ||  || Vasilevskiy || Amalie Arena || Held without fans || 2–0–0 || 4 || 
|- align="center" bgcolor="cccccc"
| — || January 17 || Dallas Stars || colspan=8|Postponed due to positive COVID-19 tests of Dallas Stars players and staff. Makeup date: May 5.
|- align="center" bgcolor="cccccc"
| — || January 19 || Dallas Stars || colspan=8|Postponed due to positive COVID-19 tests of Dallas Stars players and staff. Makeup date: May 7.
|- align="center" bgcolor="ccffcc"
| 3 || January 21 || @ Columbus Blue Jackets || 3–2 || OT || Vasilevskiy || Nationwide Arena || Held without fans || 3–0–0 || 6 || 
|- align="center" bgcolor="ffcccc"
| 4 || January 23 || @ Columbus Blue Jackets || 2–5 ||  || Vasilevskiy || Nationwide Arena || Held without fans || 3–1–0 || 6 || 
|- align="center" bgcolor="cccccc"
| — || January 26 || @ Carolina Hurricanes ||  colspan=8|Postponed due to multiple Carolina Hurricanes players placed in COVID-19 protocol. Makeup date: February 22.
|- align="center" bgcolor="B0C4DE"
| 5 || January 28 || @ Carolina Hurricanes || 0–1 || OT || Vasilevskiy || PNC Arena || Held without fans || 3–1–1 || 7 || 
|- align="center" bgcolor="ccffcc"
| 6 || January 30 || Nashville Predators || 4–3 ||  || Vasilevskiy || Amalie Arena || Held without fans || 4–1–1 || 9 || 
|-

|- align="center" bgcolor="ccffcc"
| 7 || February 1 || Nashville Predators || 5–2 ||  || Vasilevskiy || Amalie Arena || Held without fans || 5–1–1 || 11 || 
|- align="center" bgcolor="ccffcc"
| 8 || February 3 || Detroit Red Wings || 5–1 ||  || Vasilevskiy || Amalie Arena || Held without fans || 6–1–1 || 13 || 
|- align="center" bgcolor="ccffcc"
| 9 || February 5 || Detroit Red Wings || 3–1 ||  || Vasilevskiy || Amalie Arena || Held without fans || 7–1–1 || 15 || 
|- align="center" bgcolor="ccffcc"
| 10 || February 8 || @ Nashville Predators || 4–1 ||  || McElhinney || Bridgestone Arena || Not reported || 8–1–1 || 17 || 
|- align="center" bgcolor="ccffcc"
| 11 || February 9 || @ Nashville Predators || 6–1 ||  || Vasilevskiy || Bridgestone Arena || Not reported || 9–1–1 || 19 || 
|- align="center" bgcolor="ffcccc"
| 12 || February 11 || @ Florida Panthers || 2–5 ||  || Vasilevskiy || BB&T Center || 3,808 || 9–2–1 || 19 || 
|- align="center" bgcolor="ccffcc"
| 13 || February 13 || @ Florida Panthers || 6–1 ||  || Vasilevskiy || BB&T Center || 4,509 || 10–2–1 || 21 || 
|- align="center" bgcolor="ffcccc"
| 14 || February 15 || Florida Panthers || 4–6 ||  || McElhinney || Amalie Arena || 100 || 10–3–1 || 21 || 
|- align="center" bgcolor="cccccc"
| — || February 18 || @ Dallas Stars || colspan=8|Postponed due to winter storm affecting the area. Makeup date: March 2.
|- align="center" bgcolor="cccccc"
| — || February 20 || @ Dallas Stars || colspan=8|Postponed due to winter storm affecting the area. Makeup date: March 16.
|- align="center" bgcolor="ffcccc"
| 15 || February 20 || @ Carolina Hurricanes || 0–4 ||  || Vasilevskiy || PNC Arena || Held without fans || 10–4–1 || 21 || 
|- align="center" bgcolor="ccffcc"
| 16 || February 22 || @ Carolina Hurricanes || 4–2 ||  || Vasilevskiy || PNC Arena || Held without fans || 11–4–1 || 23 || 
|- align="center" bgcolor="ccffcc"
| 17 || February 24 || Carolina Hurricanes || 3–0 ||  || Vasilevskiy || Amalie Arena || 500 || 12–4–1 || 25 || 
|- align="center" bgcolor="ccffcc"
| 18 || February 25 || Carolina Hurricanes || 3–1 ||  || McElhinney || Amalie Arena || 536 || 13–4–1 || 27 || 
|- align="center" bgcolor="ccffcc"
| 19 || February 27 || Dallas Stars || 5–0 ||  || Vasilevskiy || Amalie Arena || 537 || 14–4–1 || 29 || 
|-

|- align="center" bgcolor="ccffcc"
| 20 || March 2 || @ Dallas Stars || 2–0 ||  || Vasilevskiy || American Airlines Center || 4,067 || 15–4–1 || 31 || 
|- align="center" bgcolor="ccffcc"
| 21 || March 4 || @ Chicago Blackhawks || 3–2 || OT || Vasilevskiy || United Center || Held without fans || 16–4–1 || 33 || 
|- align="center" bgcolor="B0C4DE"
| 22 || March 5 || @ Chicago Blackhawks || 3–4 || SO || McElhinney || United Center || Held without fans || 16–4–2 || 34 || 
|- align="center" bgcolor="ccffcc"
| 23 || March 7 || @ Chicago Blackhawks || 6–3 ||  || Vasilevskiy || United Center || Held without fans || 17–4–2 || 36 || 
|- align="center" bgcolor="ccffcc"
| 24 || March 9 || @ Detroit Red Wings || 4–3 || OT || Vasilevskiy || Little Caesars Arena || Held without fans || 18–4–2 || 38 ||  
|- align="center" bgcolor="ffcccc"
| 25 || March 11 || @ Detroit Red Wings || 4–6 ||  || McElhinney || Little Caesars Arena || Held without fans || 18–5–2 || 38 || 
|- align="center" bgcolor="ccffcc"
| 26 || March 13 || Nashville Predators || 6–3 ||  || Vasilevskiy || Amalie Arena || 3,800 || 19–5–2 || 40 || 
|- align="center" bgcolor="ffcccc"
| 27 || March 15 || Nashville Predators || 1–4 ||  || McElhinney || Amalie Arena || 3,800 || 19–6–2 || 40 || 
|- align="center" bgcolor="ccffcc"
| 28 || March 16 || @ Dallas Stars || 4–3 || SO || Vasilevskiy || American Airlines Center || 4,057 || 20–6–2 || 42 || 
|- align="center" bgcolor="ccffcc"
| 29 || March 18 || Chicago Blackhawks || 4–2 ||  || Vasilevskiy || Amalie Arena || 3,800 || 21–6–2 || 44 || 
|- align="center" bgcolor="ccffcc"
| 30 || March 20 || Chicago Blackhawks || 4–1 ||  || Vasilevskiy || Amalie Arena || 3,800 || 22–6–2 || 46 || 
|- align="center" bgcolor="ccffcc"
| 31 || March 21 || Florida Panthers || 5–3 ||  || McElhinney || Amalie Arena || 3,800 || 23–6–2 || 48 || 
|- align="center" bgcolor="ccffcc"
| 32 || March 23 || @ Dallas Stars || 2–1 ||  || Vasilevskiy || American Airlines Center || 4,103 || 24–6–2 || 50 || 
|- align="center" bgcolor="ffcccc"
| 33 || March 25 || @ Dallas Stars || 3–4 ||  || Vasilevskiy || American Airlines Center || 4,187 || 24–7–2 || 50 || 
|- align="center" bgcolor="ffcccc"
| 34 || March 27 || @ Carolina Hurricanes || 3–4 ||  || Vasilevskiy || PNC Arena || 4,433 || 24–8–2 || 50 || 
|- align="center" bgcolor="ffcccc"
| 35 || March 30 || Columbus Blue Jackets || 1–3 ||  || McElhinney || Amalie Arena || 3,800 || 24–9–2 || 50 || 
|-

|- align="center" bgcolor="ccffcc"
| 36 || April 1 || Columbus Blue Jackets || 3–2 ||  || Vasilevskiy || Amalie Arena || 3,800 || 25–9–2 || 52 || 
|- align="center" bgcolor="ccffcc"
| 37 || April 3 || Detroit Red Wings || 2–1 ||  || Vasilevskiy || Amalie Arena || 3,800 || 26–9–2 || 54 || 
|- align="center" bgcolor="ffcccc"
| 38 || April 4 || Detroit Red Wings || 1–5 ||  || Gibson || Amalie Arena || 3,800 || 26–10–2 || 54 || 
|- align="center" bgcolor="ffcccc"
| 39 || April 6 || @ Columbus Blue Jackets || 2–4 ||  || Vasilevskiy || Nationwide Arena || 4,080 || 26–11–2 || 54 || 
|- align="center" bgcolor="ccffcc"
| 40 || April 8 || @ Columbus Blue Jackets || 6–4 ||  || Vasilevskiy || Nationwide Arena || 4,143 || 27–11–2 || 56 || 
|- align="center" bgcolor="ccffcc"
| 41 || April 10 || @ Nashville Predators || 3–0 ||  || Vasilevskiy || Bridgestone Arena || Not reported || 28–11–2 || 58 || 
|- align="center" bgcolor="ffcccc"
| 42 || April 13 || @ Nashville Predators || 2–7 ||  || McElhinney || Bridgestone Arena || Not reported || 28–12–2 || 58 || 
|- align="center" bgcolor="ccffcc"
| 43 || April 15 || Florida Panthers || 3–2 || OT || Vasilevskiy || Amalie Arena || 3,800 || 29–12–2 || 60 || 
|- align="center" bgcolor="ffcccc"
| 44 || April 17 || Florida Panthers || 3–5 ||  || Vasilevskiy || Amalie Arena || 3,800 || 29–13–2 || 60 || 
|- align="center" bgcolor="ccffcc"
| 45 || April 19 || Carolina Hurricanes || 3–2 || OT || Vasilevskiy || Amalie Arena || 3,800 || 30–13–2 || 62 || 
|- align="center" bgcolor="ffcccc"
| 46 || April 20 || Carolina Hurricanes || 1–4 ||  || Vasilevskiy || Amalie Arena || 3,800 || 30–14–2 || 62 || 
|- align="center" bgcolor="ccffcc"
| 47 || April 22 || Columbus Blue Jackets || 3–1 ||  || McElhinney || Amalie Arena || 4,200 || 31–14–2 || 64 || 
|- align="center" bgcolor="ccffcc"
| 48 || April 25 || Columbus Blue Jackets || 4–3 || OT || Vasilevskiy || Amalie Arena || 4,200 || 32–14–2 || 66 || 
|- align="center" bgcolor="ccffcc"
| 49 || April 27 || @ Chicago Blackhawks || 7–4 ||  || Vasilevskiy || United Center || Held without fans || 33–14–2 || 68 || 
|- align="center" bgcolor="ccffcc"
| 50 || April 29 || Dallas Stars || 3–0 ||  || Vasilevskiy || Amalie Arena || 4,200 || 34–14–2 || 70 || 
|-

|- align="center" bgcolor="B0C4DE"
| 51 || May 1 || @ Detroit Red Wings || 0–1 || SO || McElhinney || Little Caesars Arena || Not reported || 34–14–3 || 71 || 
|- align="center" bgcolor="ccffcc"
| 52 || May 2 || @ Detroit Red Wings || 2–1 ||  || Gibson || Little Caesars Arena || Not reported || 35–14–3 || 73 || 
|- align="center" bgcolor="ccffcc"
| 53 || May 5 || Dallas Stars || 6–2 ||  || Vasilevskiy || Amalie Arena || 4,200 || 36–14–3 || 75 || 
|- align="center" bgcolor="ffcccc"
| 54 || May 7 || Dallas Stars || 2–5 ||  || McElhinney || Amalie Arena || 4,200 || 36–15–3 || 75 || 
|- align="center" bgcolor="ffcccc"
| 55 || May 8 || @ Florida Panthers || 1–5 ||  || Vasilevskiy || BB&T Center || 5,040 || 36–16–3 || 75 || 
|- align="center" bgcolor="ffcccc"
| 56 || May 10 || @ Florida Panthers || 0–4 ||  || Vasilevskiy || BB&T Center || 5,040 || 36–17–3 || 75 || 
|-

|-
| Lightning score listed first;

Playoffs

|- align="center" bgcolor="ccffcc"
| 1 || May 16 || @ Florida Panthers || 5–4 ||  || Vasilevskiy || BB&T Center || 9,646 || 1–0 || 
|- align="center" bgcolor="ccffcc"
| 2 || May 18 || @ Florida Panthers || 3–1 ||  || Vasilevskiy || BB&T Center || 9,646 || 2–0 || 
|- align="center" bgcolor="ffcccc"
| 3 || May 20 || Florida Panthers || 5–6 || OT || Vasilevskiy || Amalie Arena || 9,508 || 2–1 || 
|- align="center" bgcolor="ccffcc"
| 4 || May 22 || Florida Panthers || 6–2 ||  || Vasilevskiy || Amalie Arena || 9,762 || 3–1 || 
|- align="center" bgcolor="ffcccc"
| 5 || May 24 || @ Florida Panthers || 1–4 ||  || Vasilevskiy || BB&T Center || 11,551 || 3–2 || 
|- align="center" bgcolor="ccffcc"
| 6 || May 26 || Florida Panthers || 4–0 ||  || Vasilevskiy || Amalie Arena || 10,092 || 4–2 || 
|-

|- align="center" bgcolor="ccffcc"
| 1 || May 30 || @ Carolina Hurricanes || 2–1 ||  || Vasilevskiy || PNC Arena || 16,299 || 1–0 || 
|- align="center" bgcolor="ccffcc"
| 2 || June 1 || @ Carolina Hurricanes || 2–1 ||  || Vasilevskiy || PNC Arena || 16,299 || 2–0 || 
|- align="center" bgcolor="ffcccc"
| 3 || June 3 || Carolina Hurricanes || 2–3 || OT || Vasilevskiy || Amalie Arena || 13,544 || 2–1 || 
|- align="center" bgcolor="ccffcc"
| 4 || June 5 || Carolina Hurricanes || 6–4 ||  || Vasilevskiy || Amalie Arena || 13,773 || 3–1 || 
|- align="center" bgcolor="ccffcc"
| 5 || June 8 || @ Carolina Hurricanes || 2–0 ||  || Vasilevskiy || PNC Arena || 16,299 || 4–1 || 
|-

|- align="center" bgcolor="ffcccc"
| 1 || June 13 || New York Islanders || 1–2 ||  || Vasilevskiy || Amalie Arena || 14,513 || 0–1 || 
|- align="center" bgcolor="ccffcc"
| 2 || June 15 || New York Islanders || 4–2 ||  || Vasilevskiy || Amalie Arena || 14,771 || 1–1 || 
|- align="center" bgcolor="ccffcc"
| 3 || June 17 || @ New York Islanders || 2–1 ||  || Vasilevskiy || Nassau Coliseum || 12,978 || 2–1 || 
|- align="center" bgcolor="ffcccc"
| 4 || June 19 || @ New York Islanders || 2–3 ||  || Vasilevskiy || Nassau Coliseum || 12,978 || 2–2 || 
|- align="center" bgcolor="ccffcc"
| 5 || June 21 || New York Islanders || 8–0 ||  || Vasilevskiy || Amalie Arena || 14,791 || 3–2 || 
|- align="center" bgcolor="ffcccc"
| 6 || June 23 || @ New York Islanders || 2–3 || OT || Vasilevskiy || Nassau Coliseum || 12,978 || 3–3 || 
|- align="center" bgcolor="ccffcc"
| 7 || June 25 || New York Islanders || 1–0 ||  || Vasilevskiy || Amalie Arena || 14,805 || 4–3 || 
|-

|- align="center" bgcolor="ccffcc"
| 1 || June 28 || Montreal Canadiens || 5–1 ||  || Vasilevskiy || Amalie Arena || 15,911 || 1–0 || 
|- align="center" bgcolor="ccffcc"
| 2 || June 30 || Montreal Canadiens || 3–1 ||  || Vasilevskiy || Amalie Arena || 17,166 || 2–0 || 
|- align="center" bgcolor="ccffcc"
| 3 || July 2 || @ Montreal Canadiens || 6–3 ||  || Vasilevskiy || Bell Centre || 3,500 || 3–0 || 
|- align="center" bgcolor="ffcccc"
| 4 || July 5 || @ Montreal Canadiens || 2–3 || OT || Vasilevskiy || Bell Centre || 3,500 || 3–1 || 
|- align="center" bgcolor="ccffcc"
| 5 || July 7 || Montreal Canadiens || 1–0 ||  || Vasilevskiy || Amalie Arena || 18,110 || 4–1 || 
|-

|- 
| Lightning score listed first;

Player stats
Final

Skaters

Goaltenders

†Denotes player spent time with another team before joining Tampa Bay.  Stats reflect time with Tampa Bay only.
‡Traded from Tampa Bay mid-season.
Bold/italics denotes franchise record

Suspensions/fines

Awards and honours

Awards

Milestones

Transactions
The Lightning have been involved in the following transactions during the 2020–21 season.

Trades

Free agents

Waivers

Contract terminations

Retirement

Signings

Draft picks

Below are the Tampa Bay Lightning's selections at the 2020 NHL Entry Draft, which was held on October 6 and 7, 2020, via video conference call due to the COVID-19 pandemic.

Notes:

 The St. Louis Blues' second-round pick went to the Tampa Bay Lightning as the result of a trade on October 7, 2020 that sent a fourth-round pick in 2020 (124th overall) and a second-round pick in 2021 to Montreal in exchange for this pick.
Montreal previously acquired this pick as the result of a trade on February 18, 2020 that sent Marco Scandella to St. Louis in exchange for a conditional fourth-round pick in 2021 and this pick.
 The Philadelphia Flyers' third-round pick went to the Tampa Bay Lightning as the result of a trade on February 24, 2020 that sent Anthony Greco and a first-round pick in 2020 to San Jose in exchange for Barclay Goodrow and this pick.
San Jose previously acquired this pick as the result of a trade on June 18, 2019 that sent Justin Braun to Philadelphia in exchange for a second-round pick in 2019 and this pick.
 The Philadelphia Flyers' forth and fifth-round pick went to the Tampa Bay Lightning as the result of a trade on October 7, 2020 that sent Detroit's fourth-round pick in 2020 (94th overall) to Philadelphia in exchange for a fourth-round pick in 2020 (116th overall) and fifth-round pick in 2020 (147th overall) for this pick.
 The Tampa Bay Lightning's fifth-round pick will go to the Ottawa Senators as the result of a trade on July 30, 2019 that sent Mike Condon and a sixth-round pick in 2020 to Tampa Bay in exchange for Ryan Callahan and this pick.

References

Tampa Bay Lightning seasons
Tampa Bay Lightning
Tampa Bay Lightning
Tampa Bay Lightning
Tampa
Stanley Cup championship seasons